The special forces of Rhodesia were elite units that formed part of the Rhodesian Army during the Rhodesian Bush War. From 1977 they reported directly to the Commander, Combined Operations Lieutenant General Peter Walls.

The Rhodesian military considered two units to be special forces, the Special Air Service and the Selous Scouts. Combined Operations also considered the Grey's Scouts mounted infantry unit to be an elite unit, but it was not as well trained or effective as the SAS or Selous Scouts.

Headquarters, Special Forces was established on 1 July 1978 to control the special operations conducted under Combined Operations.

The SAS and Selous Scouts were disbanded in 1980 following the end of the Rhodesian Bush War and Rhodesia's transition to Zimbabwe.

See also
Special Forces of Zimbabwe

References
Citations

Works consulted

Special forces of Rhodesia